Calvitimela uniseptata is a species of lichen in the family Lecanoraceae. Found in Antarctica, it was described as new to science in 2011.

References

Lichen species
Lichens described in 2011
Lichens of Antarctica
Lecanoraceae